Rosemary Brantley is a fashion designer and Chair of the Fashion Design Department of Otis College of Art and Design since 1980. She is also co-founding member of her own sportsware company, Staples.

Brantley’s career began in Dallas, Texas, where she worked both as a fashion model and as an assistant in the Fashion Office of Neiman Marcus. There she met designer Stan Herman, who at the time taught at Parsons School of Design in New York, and later became President of the Council of Fashion Designers of America (CFDA).  Impressing Herman with her sense of style and design, Rosemary was accepted to attend Parsons on his recommendation. When Rosemary graduated from Parsons in 1973, she was named "Designer of the Year."

During the 1970s Rosemary worked for various companies in London as a designer, illustrator, and merchandiser, eventually becoming head designer of the Jaeger American Collection, prior to returning to New York City to work for Kasper Joan Leslie.

Brantley moved to Los Angeles in 1980 to accept an appointment as Department Chair of Otis’ new Fashion Design program. Under her leadership, the department grew to become one of largest and most influential fashion programs in the country, providing design talent to some of the largest U.S. apparel companies and most recognized labels. Otis’ Fashion Design program enjoys an international reputation, hosting an annual lineup of designers who directly mentor students, such as Isabel Toledo, Bob Mackie, Francisco Costa, Todd Oldham, and Cynthia Rowley. Todd Oldham has said "I have led critiques at many fashion design schools and by far Otis is the leader.  In 2005, Brantley was recognized for her significant contributions to the fashion industry by the LA Fashion Awards with their "Inspiration Award." Student work under their mentorships is showcased each year at the Otis Scholarship Benefit and Fashion Show. The event has since been staged at the Beverly Hilton Hotel in Beverly Hills, garnering critical attention from the Los Angeles Times, Women’s Wear Daily, and Apparel News.

In addition to Rosemary’s passion for education, philanthropy, and fashion design, she has long been a strong advocate for sustainability and sustainable business practices. The Otis Sustainability Alliance, founded in 2013 by Brantley brings together creative leaders from the fields of fashion, design, art, and higher education that are committed to advancing the environmental, social, educational, and economic dimensions of sustainability through their work as artists, designers, and educators. Inaugural partners included Nike, Patagonia, Disney, Eddie Bauer, Quiksilver, and Todd Oldham.

References

External links 
 YouTube Interview with Rosemary Brantley
 Rosemary Brantley in Conversation with Amy Astley, Editor of Teen Vogue
 "Fashion Forward," L.A. Times article

Year of birth missing (living people)
Living people
American fashion designers
Otis College of Art and Design faculty